This article provides details of international football games played by the Peru national football team from 2020 to present.

Results

2020

2021

2022

2023

Head to head records

Notes

References

External links

Peru national football team results
2020s in Peruvian sport